Love Letter to Edie is a 1975 American short documentary by Robert Maier. The film is about actress Edith Massey who starred in many John Waters films such as Desperate Living, Pink Flamingos, Multiple Maniacs, and Female Trouble. The film follows Edith Massey around her Baltimore thrift store, and includes fantasy sequences and stories about her past.

Cast 
 Edith Massey as herself
 John Waters as himself
 Mink Stole as Blonde Wicked Stepsister
 Delores Delux as L.A. Showgirl
 Pat Moran as Red Headed Evil Stepsister
 Ed Peranio as Brothel Client
 Vincent Peranio as Sailor in Bar
 Mary Vivian Pearce as Store Customer (uncredited)

DVD release 
The DVD release of Love Letter to Edie includes extra footage and commentary by the director. This is a director's authorized version remastered from his original 16 mm color film footage. The film was released on Blu-ray in 2019.

See also 
 Edith's Shopping Bag, a 1976 documentary about Massey

References

1975 films
American short documentary films
Documentary films about actors
Documentary films about women in film
Films shot in Baltimore
1970s short documentary films
John Waters
1970s English-language films
1970s American films